N. carnea may refer to:

 Nocardia carnea, a rod-shaped bacteria
 Noctua carnea, an owlet moth